LCMS may refer to:

Science and technology
 Liquid chromatography–mass spectrometry, a chemical analysis technique
 Learning content management system
 LittleCMS, an open-source color management system

Organizations
 Lindero Canyon Middle School, Agoura Hills, CA, USA
 Los Cerritos Middle School, Thousand Oaks, CA, USA
 Lutheran Church–Missouri Synod, a conservative Lutheran body in the United States
 Lutheran Church in Malaysia and Singapore